David McFarlane is an American and Canadian lawyer practicing and living in Los Angeles, California. He is currently a Partner with the international law firm Goodwin Proctor LLP in the firm's Los Angeles office. A specialist in health care reform law, Employee Retirement Income Security Act (ERISA) and employee benefits in the U.S., McFarlane also worked as a pension and benefits attorney in Ontario, Canada, having written a two-volume book on Ontario pension law. He also co-authored a book on Canadian Unemployment Insurance law. He is also a judge pro tem of the Superior Court of California, Los Angeles County.

Early life

Born in Hamilton, Ontario, Canada, McFarlane graduated with undergraduate degrees from McMaster University (Hamilton), and McGill University (Montreal) before earning a J.D. from the University of Windsor Faculty of Law. After passing the Ontario Bar and clerking for a judge of the Federal Court of Canada for two years he joined the law firm Osler Hoskin & Harcourt and became a partner of the firm in 1997. He moved to Los Angeles California in 1998 to join the law firm Skadden Arps Slate Meagher & Flom. Currently he is a partner with the law firm Goodwin Proctor LLP.

Career
McFarlane is a law partner with the international law firm Goodwin Proctor in the firm's Los Angeles office. Prior to that McFarlane was a law partner at Crowell & Moring, LLP, and Canada's Osler Hoskin & Harcourt. In 1998 he joined the American law firm Skadden Arps Slate Meagher & Flom in their Los Angeles office where he remained for 13 years. McFarlane founded Health Care Attorneys, P.C. which focused on the U.S. Patient Protection and Affordable Care Act and worked as an attorney with Willis Towers Watson in their Los Angeles office. He clerked for the Federal Court of Canada for Mr. Justice Andrew MacKay before joining Osler Hoskin & Harcourt in the 1990s.
McFarlane has served as a Judge Pro Tem of the Superior Court of California (Los Angeles County) and has participated in a number of Los Angeles-based Boards of Directors including as former Vice Chairman of the Board of Directors of Barlow Respiratory Hospital, former Co-President of the LGBT Bar Association of Los Angeles and former President of the Western Pension & Benefits Council, Los Angeles. He was also President of the Canadian American Bar Association (CABA) in 2011 and 2012 and Chairman of the Board of the AIDS Service Center (Pasadena) during the same period. He also participates in a number of other financial and advisory roles including Advisory Committees to the former Mayor of Los Angeles and the UCLA School of Nursing.

Personal
McFarlane resides with his husband Kenny Zerpa in Temecula California and is the father of 4 children and has one grandchild.

References

Living people
Year of birth missing (living people)
Canadian lawyers
People from Hamilton, Ontario
University of Windsor Faculty of Law alumni
McMaster University alumni
McGill University alumni